Carl Leroy Pullins (November 12, 1940 - 1984) was an American country singer and guitarist.

Pullins played in a group he put together called The LeSabres in the late 1950s, then relocated to Nashville. He gigged there for several years and eventually signed with Kapp Records in 1966; Kapp issued his debut single, "I'm a Nut", that same year. "I'm a Nut" was a hit novelty record written by Pullins himself, and reached #18 on the Billboard Country charts and #57 on the Billboard Hot 100. He released two albums on Kapp, one in 1966 and one in 1967, but further singles were not as successful as "I'm a Nut", and he eventually abandoned his career in music. He moved to Berea, Kentucky, where he was raised, and worked as a firefighter. He died of a heart attack at age 44 in May 1984.

Discography
I'm a Nut (Kapp, 1966)
Funny Bones & Hearts (Kapp, 1967)

References

1940 births
1984 deaths
American country singer-songwriters
American male singer-songwriters
American country guitarists
20th-century American male singers
20th-century American singers
Country musicians from Tennessee
Singer-songwriters from Tennessee